Apoptotic chromatin condensation inducer in the nucleus is a protein that in humans is encoded by the ACIN1 gene.

References

External links

Further reading

Human proteins